Kenny Hotz's Triumph of the Will is a Canadian television series, which debuted on July 22, 2011, on Action.

Episodes

Season 1 (2011)

DVD releases
Season 1 was released on DVD (uncensored) on November 15, 2011, in Canada.

References

External links

Official section of show creator's website
Kenny Hotz's Triumph of the Will page on IMDb
Episode 1 on Kenny Hotz's Official channel
Reviews:
National post review
itunes reviews
IMDb reviews

2011 Canadian television series debuts
2011 Canadian television series endings
Television series by Entertainment One
2010s Canadian comedy television series